Alan Harrie Daly (11 May 1929  – 3 January 2021) was an Australian rules footballer who played for the Melbourne Football Club in the Victorian Football League (VFL).

Notes

External links 

1929 births
Australian rules footballers from Victoria (Australia)
Melbourne Football Club players
Eaglehawk Football Club players
2021 deaths